Lawrence Kenneth Kasadha (born 14 Jul 1994) is a Ugandan football defender who plays for Ugandan Premier League side Bul FC.

He previously played in the same league for SC Villa, SC Victoria University, KCCA and lower tier side c and Kenyan Premier League sides Nairobi City Stars, Bandari F.C. (Kenya) and Tusker F.C.

Club career
Kasadha started out at lower tier side Jinja Municipal Council Hippos FC in 2011 before joining SC Villa in the Ugandan Premier League at the start of year 2012. After six months, midway through the 2012, he was signed by SC Victoria University.

He then moved to Kenya to join Nairobi City Stars for the 2014 season and at the end of the season he headed Coast to sign for Bandari F.C. (Kenya) for the 2015 season amidst news that he had another premiership side Ushuru F.C.

He was back to Uganda in 2016 joining KCCA  but was back in Kenya for the 2018 season with Tusker F.C.

He was released by Tusker after just six months
 and he returned to Uganda and went on to join Gaddafi FC who earned promotion to the Ugandan top flight at the end of the 2020-21 season, then his current station Bul FC.

International career
Kasadha formerly played for Uganda U20 side and has been capped five times for the Uganda national team.

Honours

Club
SC Victoria University
 Ugandan Cup: 2012-2013
Bandari
 2015 FKF President's Cup
Kampala Capital City Authority
 2016–17 Uganda Super League
Gaddafi FC
 FUFA Big League: 2020-21

References

External links
 
 

Living people
1994 births
Ugandan footballers
Nairobi City Stars players
Tusker F.C. players
SC Villa players
SC Victoria University players
Kampala Capital City Authority FC players
Bandari F.C. (Kenya) players
Bul FC players
Uganda Premier League players